Second corporal is a rank in the armed forces of some countries.

Portugal
Second corporal (segundo cabo in Portuguese) is an enlisted rank of the Portuguese Army and the Portuguese Air Force. Its rank insignia is a single chevron. The rank is immediately below first corporal (primeiro cabo). The rank of second corporal was created in the late 19th century to replace the former rank of lance-corporal (anspeçada).

United Kingdom
Second corporal was a former rank in the Royal Engineers and Army Ordnance Corps of the British Army. Second corporals wore one rank chevron like lance-corporals, but unlike the latter, which was an appointment, they held full non-commissioned officer rank. They were thus equivalent to bombardiers in the Royal Artillery. The rank was abolished in 1920.

Military ranks of the British Army